John Alpheus Charlton (5 July 1907 - 28 January 1977) was a Progressive Conservative party member of the House of Commons of Canada. He was born in Brantford, Ontario and became a farmer and veterinarian by career.

He was first elected at the Brant riding in the 1945 general election and served five consecutive terms from the 20th to the 24th Canadian Parliaments. During that time, his riding changed to Brant—Wentworth then Brant—Haldimand. Charlton was defeated in the 1962 federal election by Lawrence Pennell of the Liberal party.

During his terms in the House of Commons, he served as Parliamentary Assistant to the Minister of Agriculture (1957–1958). He was also Parliamentary Secretary to the Minister of Citizenship and Immigration (1959–1961) and to the Minister of Agriculture (1962).

Electoral record

References

External links
 

1907 births
1977 deaths
Canadian farmers
Canadian veterinarians
Male veterinarians
Members of the House of Commons of Canada from Ontario
Politicians from Brantford
Progressive Conservative Party of Canada MPs